Donald Gilbert Cook (August 9, 1934 – December 8, 1967) was a United States Marine Corps officer and a Medal of Honor recipient.

Biography
Donald Cook was born in Brooklyn, New York. He attended Xavier High School in New York City and St. Michael's College in Vermont. In 1956 he enlisted in the Marine Corps as a private but was quickly sent for officer training at the OCS in Quantico, Virginia. He was commissioned a second lieutenant in 1957. In 1960 he attended Army Language School in Monterey, California, studying Chinese and graduated near the top of his class. Lieutenant Cook was assigned to Camp H.M. Smith, Hawaii, in 1961 and was promoted to Captain March 1, 1962. He held a series of assignments in the Marine Corps and was sent to South Vietnam in late 1964, where he served as an advisor to the Vietnamese Marine Division until he was wounded and captured by the Viet Cong several weeks later. He was held as a prisoner of war by the Viet Cong from December 31, 1964 until his death from malaria at age 33, December 8, 1967 and was buried in the jungle by his fellow prisoners. He was posthumously promoted from captain to colonel. On February 26, 1980 he was officially declared dead and the Medal of Honor was presented to his wife by the Secretary of the Navy.

His body was never recovered. An official memorial stone (cenotaph) can be found in Arlington National Cemetery, Arlington, VA, Memorial Section MI Lot 110.

Decorations

Medal of Honor citation

Citation for award of Medal of Honor:

Legacy
The United States Navy   is named in his honor.

Cook Hall at the Defense Language Institute Foreign Language Center, Presidio of Monterey, in Monterey, California, is named after Donald Cook, who graduated from the school's Chinese Mandarin course in May 1961. Cook Hall was dedicated in late 2014 and is the largest and most modern academic building of the DLIFLC campus.

Colonel Donald G. Cook is honored with a 'Freedom Tree' on the Vermont State House lawn.

Colonel Donald G. Cook Chapter 5 Disabled American Veterans (DAV) of Burlington, Vermont is named in his honor. Col. Donald G. Cook Chapter 5 DAV assists veterans in obtaining compensation for their service-connected disabilities, raises funds to support the DAV travel service for disabled veterans to the White River Junction, Vermont Veterans Hospital, and generally serves the needs of disabled Veterans in Burlington and the surrounding areas.

Saint Michael's College bestows the Colonel Donald G. Cook '56 Award to alumni for unselfish service to others. It is the College's most prestigious alumni award.

The Colonel Donald G. Cook award is presented to a United States Marine Corps active duty (officer or enlisted) or Government Civilian intelligence professional to recognize professional excellence and exceptional dedication to duty in Marine Corps Intelligence.  Annually presented, the award is sponsored by the National Military Intelligence Association (NMIA).

See also

 List of Medal of Honor recipients
 List of Medal of Honor recipients for the Vietnam War

Notes

References
 
 
 Service Profile

External links
 Arlington National Cemetery

1934 births
1967 deaths
United States Marine Corps personnel of the Vietnam War
American military personnel killed in the Vietnam War
United States Marine Corps Medal of Honor recipients
People from Brooklyn
United States Marine Corps colonels
Vietnam War prisoners of war
Burials at Arlington National Cemetery
Xavier High School (New York City) alumni
Vietnam War recipients of the Medal of Honor
Military personnel from New York City